Llandanwg railway station is in the village of Llandanwg in Gwynedd, Wales. It is an unstaffed halt on the Cambrian Coast Railway with direct passenger services to Harlech, Porthmadog and Pwllheli to the north and west, and Barmouth, Machynlleth, Shrewsbury and Birmingham to the south and east.

History 
The railway line was opened by the Cambrian Railways in 1867, but the station did not open until 1929, after the Cambrian Railways had been incorporated into the Great Western Railway.

Since 22 June 2020, trains have not called at the station due to the short platform and the inability to maintain social distancing between passengers and the guard when opening the train door.

Services
Trains run approximately every two hours in both directions, but with significantly fewer trains on Sundays. All trains run as far as Pwllheli and Machynlleth, with some running beyond Machynlleth to Shrewsbury and Birmingham, whilst others provide onward connections there. Most trains call at Llandanwg only on request.

References

External links

Railway stations in Gwynedd
DfT Category F2 stations
Former Great Western Railway stations
Railway stations in Great Britain opened in 1929
Railway stations served by Transport for Wales Rail
Railway request stops in Great Britain
Llanfair, Gwynedd